This is a list of people elected Fellow of the Royal Society in 1917.

Fellows 
James Hartley Ashworth
Sir Leonard Bairstow
Grenville Arthur James Cole
Charles Frederick Cross
Henry Drysdale Dakin
Arthur Stewart Eve
Sir Herbert Jackson
John Smyth Macdonald
John William Nicholson
Sir Robert Howson Pickard
Charles Tate Regan
Sir Robert Robertson
Sir Edward John Russell
Samuel George Shattock
Frederick Ernest Weiss

1917
1917 in the United Kingdom
1917 in science